A Grammar of the Macedonian Literary Language is the title of the first English-language grammar of Macedonian. The grammar was written by Horace Lunt, an American working in Yugoslavia.

Bibliography
 Lunt, H. G. (1952) A Grammar of the Macedonian Literary Language (Skopje)

Macedonian grammar
Grammar books